Kata'ib al-Imam Ali (Kataʾib al-ʾImām ʿAlīy), also known as  the Imam Ali Battalions, are the armed wing of the Islamic Movement of Iraq (Harakat al-Iraq al-Islamiyah) and serve as part of the umbrella organization "Popular Mobilization Forces", Kata'ib al-Imam Ali is prominently involved in the Iraqi Civil War, fighting against the Islamic State of Iraq and the Levant (ISIL).

History
Kata'ib al-Imam Ali came into existence in June 2014 as the armed wing of the Harakat al-Iraq al-Islamiyah (Movement of the Islamic Iraq) party. While its emergence was linked to the large-scale Shia mobilization after the escalation of Iraq's Sunni Arab insurgency into a full-out civil war, Kata'ib al-Imam Ali is closely connected to older Iraqi Shia Islamist organizations, parties and militias, as well as to the Iranian Quds Force. The group's secretary general Shibl al-Zaydi is affiliated with the Sadrist Movement, and was at one point member of the anti-American Mahdi Army. Kata'ib al-Imam Ali also appears to enjoy the favour of Abu Mahdi al-Muhandis, leader of the Popular Mobilization Forces, who has at times even personally led the group into battle. Thanks to these links, Kata'ib al-Imam Ali is well-equipped and has been able to recruit veteran militants, allowing a "meteoric growth".

Notably, Kata'ib al-Imam Ali has also attempted to rally Syriac Christian Assyrians to its cause since its formation, based on a purported affinity between Shia Islam and Christians and the supposed betrayal of the Iraqi Christians by Iraqi Kurdistan in course of the Fall of Mosul. In line with these attempts, the group has formed its own, though minor, Christian unit, the "Spirit of God Jesus Son of Mary Battalions".

In late 2014, one of the group's commanders, Abu Azrael, gained prominence after appearing in the media armed with axes, swords and machine guns.

In 2015, Kata'ib al-Imam Ali began to send its fighters to Syria, allegedly to protect the Sayyidah Zaynab Shrine, and participated in the Second Battle of Tikrit. In early 2016, its fighters were involved in the Syrian government offensive to reconquer Palmyra and Tadmur from ISIL, and later that year, Kata'ib al-Imam Ali took part in the Battle of Mosul and the Aleppo offensive (November–December 2016).

See also

 Popular Mobilization Forces
 List of armed groups in the Iraqi Civil War
 Holy Shrine Defender

References

External links

Anti-ISIL factions in Iraq
Anti-ISIL factions in Syria
Popular Mobilization Forces
Pro-government factions of the Syrian civil war
Shia Islamist groups
Islamism in Iraq
Paramilitary organizations based in Iraq
Military units and formations established in 2014
Anti-Americanism
Military wings of political parties
Jihadist groups in Iraq
Jihadist groups in Syria
Anti-Zionist organizations
Anti-Zionism in Iraq